"Ho capito che ti amo" is an Italian language  song written by singer-songwriter Luigi Tenco, with music arranged by Ezio Leoni, and released on the Italian record label Jolly in September 1964 as Side A of a 45 rpm side B being "Io lo so già".

"Ho capito che ti amo" meaning 'I realized that I love you' also appeared on Luigi Tenco's self-titled 1965 album Luigi Tenco.

Versions
The song was a single for Italian pop singer Wilma Goich on the Italian record label Dischi Ricordi with side B being "Era troppo bello".

Other famous versions include those by Joe Diverio, Nicola di Bari and Emilio Pericoli. It was translated into many other languages.

In 2006, the song was part of the soundtrack of Le héros de la famille a film directed by Thierry Klifa. The song was interpreted by Catherine Deneuve.

References

1964 singles
Italian-language songs
1964 songs